Byronia  is a genus of theca-bearing cnidarians with a close affinity to the coronatid 
scyphozoans.

References

External links

Scyphozoa
Paleozoic cnidarians
Prehistoric cnidarian genera
Fossil taxa described in 1899
Paleozoic life of British Columbia